Valve cover racing is a competitive event similar to the Pinewood derby, but vehicles are made from a valve cover from an internal combustion car engine, rather than of wood blocks, . Valve cover racing is most commonly seen at car shows.

Events

Rules and regulations will change depending on the venue, but the basics remain the same: Competitors must construct a vehicle using a valve cover from a car's engine. Usually it must have four wheels. It can be decorated or modified within the rules set by the organizing body. The valve cover is powered by gravity. In a valve cover race, two or more racing valve covers are placed at the top of a specially constructed incline, which can be straight or curved. They are released at the same time and the first to cross a finish line at the bottom of the incline wins the race. Win lights or timers may be used to more accurately determine the winner of a race. Valve cover racing is often an event for children at car shows, although adult valve cover race events are also seen.

See also
 Pinewood derby
 Woodcar Independent Racing League
 CO2 dragster
 Hot Wheels

External links
 Black Canyon Classics, Valve-Cover Racing site
 Photos from a 1998 Event in Bakersfield, California

Auto racing by type